Fragilysin (Bacteroides fragilis (entero)toxin) is an enzyme. This enzyme catalyses the following chemical reaction

 Broad proteolytic specificity, bonds hydrolysed including -Gly-Leu-, -Met-Leu-, -Phe-Leu-, -Cys-Leu-, Leu-Gly

It is thought to be a cause of diarrhoea in animals and humans.

References

External links 
 

EC 3.4.24